St. Johns High School is a school in the Goregaon locality in Mumbai, India. 

It was started in 1969 by the first Principal, Mrs.Mabel Aranha. The school used the SSC syllabus & later on switched to the ICSE syllabus of education under its new ownership. The school is currently celebrating its Golden Jubilee in 2019 (50 years).

In 2008 the school was taken over by the Universal group of schools and is currently known by its new name St. John's Universal School.
Mothers of famous personalities like Frieda Pinto and Omung Kumar taught there.

Starting from 2018, The School has started accepting students for the ISC board of 11th and 12th. It offers three streams- Science, Commerce and Arts.

Notable alumni
 Ronak Pandit

External links

 stjohnsuniversal.edu.in

Schools in Mumbai
Educational institutions established in 1970
1970 establishments in Maharashtra